"Watching You" was the second single release from the 1988 album The Real Chuckeeboo by British group Loose Ends. It was written as most of their songs were by Carl McIntosh, Jane Eugene and Steve Nichol; it was co-produced by Loose Ends and longtime collaborator Nick Martinelli. The song reached number #2 on the Billboard R&B Chart; noted among Loose Ends fans as one of their finest efforts it was also one of their biggest hits.

Chart performance

References

External links
 Watching You @ Discogs

Loose Ends (band) songs
1988 singles
Song recordings produced by Nick Martinelli
Songs written by Carl McIntosh (musician)
Songs written by Jane Eugene
Songs written by Steve Nichol
1988 songs
Virgin Records singles